Courtrock is an unincorporated community in Grant County, Oregon.

History
The community was named for a nearby formation known as Courthouse Rock. The Courtrock post office was established in April 1926, and closed on May 31, 1953. Viola A. Lauder served as the first postmaster.

References

Unincorporated communities in Grant County, Oregon
Unincorporated communities in Oregon
1926 establishments in Oregon
1953 disestablishments in Oregon